This is a complete listing of the works by Kazi Nazrul Islam, in the Bengali language.

Poetry
Agnibeena (The Fiery Lute), 1922
Sanchita (Collected poems), 1925
Phanimanasa (The Cactus), 1927
Chakrabak (The Flamingo), 1929
Satbhai Champa (The Seven Brothers of Champa), juvenile poems, 1933
Nirjhar (Fountain), 1939
Natun Chand (The New Moon), 1939
Morubhaskar (The Sun in the Desert), 1951
Sanchayan (Collected Poems), 1955
Nazrul Islam: Islami Kobita (A Collection of Islamic Poems; Dhaka, Bangladesh:  Islamic Foundation, 1982)

Poems and songs

Dolan Chapa (name of a faintly fragrant monsoon flower), 1923
Bisher Bashi (The Poison Flute), 1924
Bhangar Gan (The Song of Destruction), 1924 proscribe in 1924
Chhayanat (The Raga of Chhayanat), 1925
Chittanama (On Chittaranjan), 1925
Samyabadi (The Proclaimer of Equality), 1926
Puber Hawa (The Eastern Wind), 1926
Sarbahara (The Proletariat), 1926
Sindhu Hindol (The Undulation of the Sea), 1927
Jinjir (Chain), 1928
Pralaya Shikha (Doomsday Flame), 1930 proscribed in 1930
Shesh Saogat (The Last Offerings), 1958

Prose

Short stories
Bathar Daan (Offering of Pain), 1922
Rikter Bedon (The Sorrows of Destitute), 1925
Shiulimala (Garland of Shiuli) 1931
Padmagokhra
Ognigiri (The Volcano)
Jiner Badsha (The King of the Jinns)

Novels
Bandhan Hara (Free from Bonds), 1927
Mrityukshuda (Hunger for Death), 1930
Kuhelika (Mystery), 1931

Plays and drama
Jhilimili (Window Shutters), plays, 1930
Aleya (Mirage), song drama, 1931
Putuler Biye (Doll's Marriage), children's play, 1933
Madhumala (Garland of Honeysuckle) a musical play, 1960
Jhar (Storm), juvenile poems and play, 1960
Pile Patka Putuler Biye (Doll's Marriage), juvenile poems and play, 1964
Shilpi (Artist)

Essays
Joog Bani (The Message of the Age), 1926
Jhinge Phul (The Cucurbitaccus Flower), 1926
Durdiner Jatri (The Traveller through Rough Times), 1926
Rudra Mangal (The Violent Good), 1927
Dhumketu (The Comet), 1961

See also
Kazi Nazrul Islam

Bengali poetry
Bengali-language literature
Bengali music
Kazi Nazrul Islam